Mohammed Arafah (Arabic:محمد عرفه) (born 3 March 1991) is an Egyptian born-Qatari footballer. He currently plays for Al-Markhiya .

External links
 

Egyptian footballers
Qatari footballers
1991 births
Living people
Qatar Stars League players
Qatari Second Division players
Al-Wakrah SC players
Al-Markhiya SC players
Association football defenders
Egyptian emigrants to Qatar
Naturalised citizens of Qatar
Qatari people of Egyptian descent